The Big Easy is a nickname for the city of New Orleans, Louisiana, United States.

The Big Easy may also refer to:

 The Big Easy (film), a 1986 film, set and shot in New Orleans
 The Big Easy (TV series), 1996, based on the film
 Ernie Els (born 1969), a South African professional golfer known as "The Big Easy" 
 Big Easy Tour, a Southern Africa golf tour named after the golfer
 Nathaniel "Big Easy" Lofton (born 1981), an American basketball player

See also 

Easy (disambiguation)